Pike Township is a township in Stoddard County, in the U.S. state of Missouri.

Pike Township was erected in 1829, taking its name from Zebulon Pike.

References

Townships in Missouri
Townships in Stoddard County, Missouri
1829 establishments in Missouri